This is a list of Dalek comic strips, illustrated annuals and graphic novels. Cameo appearances and reprints are only covered if notable.

Annuals, books and graphic novels
The Dalek Book (1964) Writers: David Whitaker, Terry Nation. Artist: A.B. Cornwell, Richard Jennings, John Woods. Panther Books Ltd. / Souvenir Press Ltd. Hardcover, 96 pages.
Six comic strips, four illustrated text stories, one photo story and seven features. One of the earliest items of Dalek merchandise. The photo story utilises selected stills from the 1963–64 Doctor Who serial, The Daleks, to relate an original account of an unaccompanied Susan Foreman meeting the Daleks, whilst the features include a game, a cutaway drawing of the interior of a Dalek and a map of Skaro.
 Comic strip stories: Invasion of the Daleks, The Oil Well, City of the Daleks, The Humanoids, Monsters of Gurnian, Battle for the Moon.
 Text stories with illustrations: Red for Danger, The Secret of the Mountain, The Small Defender, Break-through!.
 Photo Story: The Message of Mystery.
 Features: The Dalek Planetarium, The Dalekode, Anatomy of a Dalek, Dodge the Dalek, Dalek War Machines, Dalography of Skaro, The Dalek Dictionary.The Dalek World (1965) Writers: David Whitaker, Terry Nation. Artists: A.B. Cornwell, Richard Jennings, W. Wiggins, John Woods. Panther Books Ltd. / Souvenir Press Ltd. Hardcover, 96 pages.
Six comic strips, four illustrated text stories and ten features. Two of the features deal with the Dr. Who Dalek films, utilising selected stills from the 1965 film Dr. Who and the Daleks.
 Comic strip stories: The Mechanical Planet, Treasure of the Daleks, The Invisible Invaders, The Orbitus, The World That Waits, Masters of the World.
 Text stories with illustrations: The Secret Struggle, The Five Leaf Clover, The Log of the Gypsy Joe, Manhunt.
 Features: The Dalek Task Force, Filming the Daleks, Direct a Dalek Film, The Dalekreed, Inside a Skaro Saucer, Anti–Dalek Weapons, Strange to Tell, What to do if a Dalek Attacks, Know Your Enemy, War in Space (illustration).Dr. Who and the Daleks (1966) Writer: Terry Nation. Artists: Dick Giordano, Sal Trapani. Dell Publishing Co. Inc. Softcover, 31 pages.
 Comic strip adaptation of the first Dalek film; Dr. Who and the Daleks.The Dalek Outer Space Book (1966) Writers: Terry Nation, Brad Ashton. Artists: Richard Jennings, Leslie Waller, John Woods, Art Sansom. Panther Books Ltd. / Souvenir Press Ltd. Hardcover, 96 pages.
Seven comic strips, four illustrated text stories and eleven features. Two of the comic strips and one of the text stories are completely Dalek unrelated, whilst in a third comic strip the Daleks are mentioned but not seen.
 Comic strip stories: The Dalek Trap, Sara Kingdom: Space Security Agent, The Super Sub, The Secret of the Emperor, The Sea Monsters, Chris Welkin-Planeteer (reprint of a newspaper comic strip), The Brain Tappers.
 Text stories with illustrations: The Outlaw Planet, The Living Death, The Unwilling Traveller, Diamond Dust.
 Features: Dalek Saturn Probe, The Strata of Skaro, Dalekwiz, Top Secret, Mystery Message from Space, The Dalesub, The Emperor's Brain, The Evolution of Planet Skaro, Man in Space, Space Aptitude Test, The Great Mercury Plot.TV Comic Annual 1968 Writers: Various. Artists: Various. TV Publications Ltd. Hardcover, 96 pages.
The included Doctor Who comic strip is notable for the artist's depiction of Daleks as having only one dome light.
 Comic strip story: Attack of the Daleks. Writer: Roger Noel Cook. Artist: Patrick Williams.

Doctor Who & The Daleks Omnibus (1976) Writers Terry Nation, Terrence Dicks. Artist: uncredited. Artus Publishing Ltd. Hardcover, 160 pages.
One comic strip, two illustrated text stories (being abridged versions of the Planet of the Daleks and Genesis of the Daleks Doctor Who TV serial novelisations) and six features. The last frame of the comic strip is a pictorial puzzle for the reader to solve. Produced under the 'St Michael' banner exclusively for retail through the Marks & Spencer chain of UK high street department stores.
 Comic strip story: Invasion – The Enemy Within.
 Text stories with illustrations: Doctor Who and the Genesis of the Daleks, Doctor Who and the Planet of the Daleks,
 Features: The Seventh Galaxy, On Camera, The Anatomy of a Dalek, The Forbidden Planet, Doctor Who and the Daleks Media History, The Dalek Deep Space Cruiser.Dalek Annual 1976 Writers: Uncredited. Artists: Uncredited. World Distributors (Manchester), Ltd. Hardcover, 62 pages. .
Two comic strips, four illustrated text stories and fourteen features.
 Comic strip stories: Planet of Serpents, Flood!!!.
 Text stories with illustrations: Terror Task Force, Exterminate! Exterminate! Exterminate!, Nightmare, Timechase.
 Features: The Fantastic Spacecraft, Mark 7 Humanoid Robot, Dalek Genius, Sci-Fi Film Quiz, Anti Dalek Force Apitude Tests, Intercept, The Prophets of Space, Selectaword, Earth-Skaro Timescale, Cryptography, Spacewords, Man and Myth, Timepassers, The Island of Sezam.

Dalek Annual 1977 Writers: Uncredited. Artists: Uncredited. World Distributors (Manchester), Ltd. Hardcover, 78 pages. .
Three comic strips, three illustrated text stories and eighteen features. The comic strips are re-prints of the TV Century 21 Dalek stories The Penta Ray Factor, The Menace of the Monstrons and The Archives of Phryne, renamed in two instances.
 Comic strip stories: The Envoys of Evil, The Menace of the Monstrons, The Quest.
 Text stories with illustrations: The Doomsday Machine, Report from an Unknown Planet, The Fugitive.
 Features: Escape from Skaro!, T.A.P., Special Report, The Dark Side of Skaro, Fantastic! Astonishing! Incredible! Amazing!, Identification Parade, Timepassers, Startrack, Science Fiction Questions, The Time Computer, The Monsters of Inner Space, Space World Special, Survival, Anti-Dalek Force Aptitude Tests, Hidden Space Names, The Calorian Stone, The Greatest Computer of All, Science Fiction – Science Fact.

Dalek Annual 1978 Writers: Uncredited. Artists: Uncredited. World Distributors (Manchester), Ltd. Hardcover, 62 pages. .
One comic strip, three illustrated text stories and sixteen features. The comic strip is a re-print of the TV Century 21 Dalek story The Rogue Planet.
 Comic strip story: The Rogue Planet.
 Text stories with illustrations: The Castaway, The Seeds of Destruction, Assassination Squad.
 Features: The Enigma of the Missing Planet, The Enigma Factor, Davros: Genius or Madman?, Would You Believe?, Mental Jigsaw, The Judgment of Gozan, Sabotage!!!, Dalek Computer Print-Out, The Amazing Planet Magnetron, You Don't Have a Clue, Anti-Dalek Force Aptitude Tests, Where in the World?, The Amazing Journey, Minefield, True or False, Timepassers.

Dalek Annual 1979 Writers: Uncredited. Artists: Uncredited. World Distributors (Manchester), Ltd. Hardcover, 62 pages. .
Two comic strips, three illustrated text stories and sixteen features.
 Comic strip stories: The Human Bombs, Island of Horror.
 Text stories with illustrations: Blockade, The Solution, The Planet That Cried Wolf!.
 Features: Repair Analysis, ADF Aptitude Test (File 1, 2 and 3), Committee of War, Special Report (1 and 2), Number Slip, Kidnap on Kasby, Battle Statistics, Surveillance Report, Hostage!, Race to the Golden Emperor.

Doctor Who Yearbook 1993 Writers: Justin Richards, John Nathan-Turner, Andrew Pixley, David J. Howe, Karen Dunn, Nigel Robinson, Paul Cornell, Terrance Dicks, Marc Platt, Colin Baker. Artists: Lee Sullivan, Paul Vyse. Marvel UK. Hardcover, 64 pages. .
One comic strip, one illustrated text story (in six parts) and twelve features.
 Comic strip story: Metamorphosis. Writer: Paul Cornell. Artist: Lee Sullivan.
 Text story with illustrations: Brief Encounters. Writers: Various. Artist: Paul Vyse.
 Features: Spearheads From Space, Daggers of the Mind, Making (New) Myths, The Sonic Screwdriver, Collectors Corner: The Silly Season, Terrible Tunes, Dressing Up, Monster File, Anatomy of a Robot Yeti, Anatomy of the Imperial Dalek, Future Dalek Design?.

The Dalek Chronicles (1994) Writers: Alan Fennell, David Whitaker. Artists: Richard Jennings, Eric Eden, Ron Turner. Marvel UK Ltd. Softcover, 106 pages. ISSN 1353-7628.
 Omnibus reprint of the sixteen The Daleks comic strip stories originally published in Issues 1–104 of TV Century 21 (see below), with cover art by Ron Turner and a new foreword.

Doctor Who: The Only Good Dalek (2010) Writer: Justin Richards. Artist: Mike Collins. BBC Books. Hardcover, 128 pages. .
The story features the first comic-style appearance of the New Paradigm Dalek design.
 Graphic novel.

Doctor Who: The Dalek Project (2012) Writer: Justin Richards. Artist: Mike Collins. BBC Books. Hardcover, 96 pages. .
Release was originally scheduled for September 2009, with publicity artwork indicating that it was to be a Tenth Doctor story. When finally published three years later the story and artwork had been revised to feature the Eleventh Doctor. The delay in publication was due to similarities with the storyline of the Doctor Who episode "Victory of the Daleks" (2010).
 Graphic novel.

Dalek: The Astounding Untold History of the Greatest Enemies of the Universe (2017) Writers: George Mann, Justin Richards, Cavan Scott. Artists: Alex Fort, Mike Collins. BBC Books. Hardcover, 320 pages. .
Four comic strips, five text stories and eight articles.
 Comic strip stories: Ambush, Safe Haven, Empire of the Daleks, Cyber Crisis. Writers: Various. Artist: Mike Collins.
 Text stories with illustrations: Davros Genesis,  Abduction, Infection of the Daleks, Lost Patrol,  War and Peace. Writers: Various. Artist: Alex Fort.
 Articles with illustrations: How the Daleks were created for TV, Changing Dalek Designs, The voice of the Daleks, The Dalek invasion of toyshops, Print of the Daleks, Daleks in movies and stage shows, Daleks in audios and exhibitions, The Dalek invasion of pop culture. Writers: Various. Artist: Alex Fort.   

Doctor Who Bookazine #23: The Daleks (2020) Writers: Alan Fennell, David Whitaker. Editor: Marcus Hearn. Artists: Richard Jennings, Eric Eden, Ron Turner. Panini Comics. Softcover, 114 pages. .
 Omnibus reprint of the sixteen The Daleks comic strip stories originally published in Issues 1–104 of TV Century 21 (see below), with cover art by Mike Collins. Includes features about the writers, illustrators, publishers and creation of the strip, an interview with artist Ron Turner, and an article about the sourcing and restoration of the artwork.

Time Lord Victorious: Defender of the Daleks (2021) Writer: Jody Houser. Artists: Roberta Ingranata, Enrica Eren Angiolini. Titan Comics. Softcover, 112 pages. .
One comic strip, a covers gallery, an interview with James Goss, an article 'The Art Process', a series time line, a reader's guide, and biographies of the author and artists.
 Collects the Doctor Who: Time Lord Victorious #1-2 comics.

Daleks: The Ultimate Collection Comic Strip Collection Volume 1 (2022) Writers: Steve Moore, John Wagner, Richard Allen, Steve Allen, Paul Cornell. Editor: Ed Hammond. Artists: Paul Neary, David Lloyd, Steve Dillon, Dave Gibbons, Lee Sullivan. Panini Comics. Softcover, 164 pages. .
 Omnibus reprint of the Dalek comic strip stories The Return of the Daleks, Abslom Daak – Dalek Killer, Star Tigers, Doctor Who and the Dogs of Doom, Nemesis of the Daleks, and Metamorphosis, originally published in Doctor Who Magazine (see below) and the Doctor Who Year Book 1993, with cover art by Anthony Lamb. Includes an appendix featuring contributions and commentary from the artists and writers, and behind-the-scenes information.

Daleks: The Ultimate Collection Comic Strip Collection Volume 2 (2022) Writers: Richard Allen, Alan Barnes, Paul Cornell, John Freeman, Scott Gray, John Lawrence. Editor: Ed Hammond. Artists: Lee Sullivan, Martin Geraghty, Robin Smith, Ron Turner. Panini Comics. Softcover, 172 pages. .
 Omnibus reprint of the Dalek comic strip stories Emperor of the Daleks, Bringer of Darkness, Up above the Gods, The Daleks: Return of the Elders, Daleks versus the Martians, Fire and Brimstone, and Children of the Revolution, originally published in Doctor Who Magazine, with cover art by Anthony Lamb. Includes an appendix featuring contributions and commentary from the artists and writers, and behind-the-scenes information.

Comics

TV Century 21
The Daleks single page comic strip. Sixteen stories / one hundred and four instalments. 1965–1967. Century 21 Publishing / City Magazines Ltd.
The strip appeared in full colour on the rear page of the comic. Although credited to Terry Nation (the creator of the Dalek concept for the BBC Doctor Who programme) his contribution to the writing, if any, is unclear. In an interview for Doctor Who Classic Comics the first editor of TV Century 21, Alan Fennell, stated that he (Fennell) was primarily responsible for the initial two or three stories. David Whitaker (the original script editor for the Doctor Who television programme) then took over, with Fennell retaining plot approval and providing some story input thereafter. As originally published the sixteen stories comprising the strip had no individual titles. Those given in this article have come into common use, being the result of research by Big Finish Productions' producer, director, script-editor and voice actor John Ainsworth.
 Genesis of Evil – Issues 1–3 (23 January 1965 – 6 February 1965) Writers: Alan Fennell, David Whitaker. Artist: Richard Jennings.
 Power Play – Issues 4–10 (13 February 1965 – 8 May 1965) Writers: Alan Fennell, David Whitaker. Artist: Richard Jennings.
 Duel of the Daleks – Issues 11–17 (3 April 1965 – 15 May 1965) Writers: Alan Fennell, David Whitaker. Artist: Richard Jennings.
 The Amaryll Challenge – Issues 18–24 (22 May 1965 – 3 July 1965) Writer: David Whitaker. Artist: Richard Jennings.
 The Penta Ray Factor – Issues 25–32 (10 July 1965 – 28 August 1965) Writer: David Whitaker. Artist: Richard Jennings.
 Plague of Death – Issues 33–39 (4 September 1965 – 16 October 1965) Writer: David Whitaker. Artist: Richard Jennings.
 The Menace of the Monstrons – Issues 40–46 (23 October 1965 – 4 December 1965) Writer: David Whitaker. Artist: Richard Jennings.
 Eve of the War – Issues 47–51 (11 December 1965 – 8 January 1966) Writer: David Whitaker. Artist: Richard Jennings, Ron Turner.
 The Archives of Phryne – Issues 52–58 (15 January 1966 – 26 February 1966) Writer: David Whitaker. Artist: Eric Eden.
 Rogue Planet – Issues 59–62 (5 March 1966 – March 1966) Writer: David Whitaker. Artist: Ron Turner.
 Impasse – Issues 63–69 (2 April 1966 – 14 May 1966) Writer: David Whitaker. Artist: Ron Turner.
 The Terrorkon Harvest – Issues 70–75 (21 May 1966 – 25 June 1966) Writer: David Whitaker. Artist: Ron Turner.
 Legacy of Yesteryear – Issues 76–85 (2 July 1966 – 3 September 1966) Writer: David Whitaker. Artist: Ron Turner.
 Shadow of Humanity – Issues 86–89 (10 September 1966 – 1 October 1966) Writer: David Whitaker. Artist: Ron Turner.
 Emissaries of Jevo – Issues 90–95 (8 October 1966 – 12 November 1966) Writer: David Whitaker. Artist: Ron Turner.
 The Road to Conflict – Issues 96–104 (19 November 1966 – 14 January 1967) Writer: David Whitaker. Artist: Ron Turner.

TV Comic
Doctor Who comic strip, featuring the Daleks in nine stories / thirty five instalments. 1967–1977. Beaverbrook / Polystyle Publications Ltd.
Although TV Comic included a Doctor Who strip from 1964, City Magazines' TV Century 21 title held the rights to use the Daleks in comic strip form until 1966. Consequently, the Daleks were absent from TV Comic until the January 1967 story 'The Trodos Ambush'. Subsequently, the rights passed to Countdown / TV Action from 1971 to 1973, returning once again to TV Comic between 1974 and 1977.
 The Trodos Ambush – Issues 788–791 (21 January 1967 – 11 February 1967) Writer: Roger Noel Cook. Artist: John Canning.
 The Doctor Strikes Back – Issues 792–795 (18 February 1967 – 11 March 1967) Writer: Roger Noel Cook. Artist: John Canning.
 The Exterminator – Issues 803–806 (6 May 1967 – 27 May 1967) Writer: Roger Noel Cook. Artist: John Canning.
 Jungle Adventure – TV Comic Holiday Special (May 1967) Writer: Roger Noel Cook. Artist: Patrick Williams.
 The Disintegrator – Issues 1155–1159 (2 February 1974 – 2 March 1974) Writer: Unknown. Artist: Gerry Haylock.
 Return of the Daleks! – Issues 1215–1222 (29 March 1975 – 17 May 1975) Writer: Unknown. Artist: Gerry Haylock.
 The Dalek Revenge – Issues 1251–1258 (6 December 1975 – 24 January 1976) Writer: Unknown. Artist: John Canning.
 Invasion – TV Comic Winter Special (Winter 1977) Writer: Dick O'Neil. Artist: Gerry Haylock. (re-printed 'The Threat from Beneath' from Countdown issue 112 with Jon Pertwee's features replaced by Tom Baker's).

Countdown / TV Action
Doctor Who comic strip, featuring the Daleks in three stories / seventeen instalments. 1972–1973. Polystyle Publications Ltd.
During a production run which lasted from 1971 to 1973 the comic's title changed frequently, with the Doctor Who strip appearing in almost every edition.
 Subzero – Issues 47–54 (8 January 1972 – 26 February 1972) Writer: Dennis Hooper. Artist: Gerry Haylock.
 The Planet of the Daleks – Issues 55–62 (4 March 1972 – 22 April 1972) Writer: Dennis Hooper. Artist: Gerry Haylock.
 The Threat From Beneath – Issue 112 (7 April 1973) Writer: Dick O'Neil. Artist: Gerry Haylock.

Magazines

Doctor Who Weekly
Five stories / twenty two instalments. 1979–1980. Marvel UK.
Although Polystyle ceased to publish a Doctor Who comic strip in 1973 it retained the rights until 1979, effectively banishing the character and his adversaries from the medium for five years. Marvel UK subsequently obtained the rights in 1979 and immediately made use of them by including a comic strip featuring the Daleks in the first issue of its new Doctor Who Weekly magazine. Further Dalek-related stories followed.
 The Return of the Daleks – Issues 1–4 (17 October 1979 – 7 November 1979) Writer: Steve Moore. Artists: Paul Neary, David Lloyd.
 Abslom Daak – Dalek Killer – Issues 17–20 (6 February 1980 – 27 February 1980) Writer: Steve Moore. Artist: Steve Dillon.
 Timeslip – Issues 17–18 (6 February 1980 – 13 February 1980) Writers: Dez Skinn, Paul Neary. Artist: Paul Neary.
 The Dogs of Doom – Issues 27–34 (16 April 1980 – 5 June 1980) Writers: John Wagner, Pat Mills. Artist: Dave Gibbons.
 Star Tigers Part One – Issues 27–30 (6 April 1980 – 7 May 1980) Writer: Steve Moore. Artists: Steve Dillon, David Lloyd.

Doctor Who Magazine
Eight stories / thirty two instalments. 1980–2002. Marvel UK. / Panini Comics (from 1995)
Financial problems resulted in Marvel's Doctor Who Weekly becoming a monthly publication from September 1980. Several title variations were used before Doctor Who Magazine was finally settled upon in 1985. Comic strips were retained as a regular feature, with the Daleks making an appearance at irregular intervals.

 Star Tigers Part Two – Issues 44–46 (September 1980 – November 1980) Writer: Steve Moore. Artists: Steve Dillon, David Lloyd.
 Nemesis of The Daleks – Issues 152–155 (September 1989 – December 1989) Writers: Richard Alan, Steve Alan. Artist: Lee Sullivan.
 Bringer of Darkness – Doctor Who Magazine Summer Special (1993) Writer: Warwick Gray. Artists: Martin Geraghty, Simon Weston.
 Emperor of the Daleks – Issues 197–202 (17 March 1993 – 4 August 1993) Writer: Paul Cornell. Artist: Lee Sullivan.
 Daleks versus the Martians – Doctor Who Magazine Spring Special (1996) Writer: Alan Barnes. Artist: Lee Sullivan.
 Return of the Elders – Issues 249–254 (12 March 1997 – 30 July 1997) Writer: John Lawrence. Artist: Ron Turner.
 Fire and Brimstone – Issues 251–255 (7 May 1997 – 27 August 1997) Writer: Alan Barnes. Artists: Martin Geraghty, Robin Smith.
 Children of the Revolution – Issues 312–317 (9 January 2002 – 29 May 2002) Writer: Scott Gray. Artists: Lee Sullivan, Adrian Salmon.

Doctor Who – Battles in Time
One story / four instalments. 2008. GE Fabbri.
The story features the first comic strip appearance of the New Series Dalek design, as seen in the Doctor Who television programme from 2005 onward. Each instalment of the story was published with a separate title.
 Carnage Zoo / Flight and Fury / The Living Ghosts / Extermination of the Daleks – Issues 57–60 (12 November 2008 – 24 December 2008) Writer: Steve Cole. Artists: Lee Sullivan, Alan Craddock.

See also

 Dalek variants
 List of Doctor Who comic stories

References

External links
 TARDIS Data Core: Dalek Annuals
 Altered Vistas: In the Comics – Doctorless Strips
 The Ensovaari Embassy: The Daleks – Dalek Comic Strips
 flickr: The Dalek Chronicles (Complete)

Doctor Who lists
Dalek stories
Comics based on Doctor Who
British comic strips
Lists of comic strips
Lists of books